Kelvin is the codename for a GPU microarchitecture developed by Nvidia, and released in 2001, as the successor to Celsius microarchitecture. It was named with reference to William Thomson (Baron Kelvin) and used with the GeForce 4 and 3 series.

Graphics Features 

 DirectX 8.0
 OpenGL 1.2 (1.5)
 Shader Model 1.3
 Vertex Shader 1.1
 Max VRAM size bumped to 128MB
 New memory controller with Z compression

Due to the lack of unified shaders, you will not be able to run recent games at all (DirectX 10 mini).

Chips

GeForce 3 (3xxx) series 

 NV20, 57 million transistor

GeForce 4 (4xxx) series 

 NV2A (Xbox GPU), 57 million transistor
 NV25, 63 million transistor
 NV28, 36 million transistor
 NV17
 NV18

GPU list

GeForce 3 (3xxx) series

GeForce 4 (4xxx) series

See also 

 List of eponyms of Nvidia GPU microarchitectures
 List of Nvidia graphics processing units
 Scalable Link Interface (SLI)
 Qualcomm Adreno

References

External links 

GPGPU
Nvidia Kelvie
Nvidia microarchitectures
Parallel computing
Graphics cards